Chaura, or Tutet is one of the Nicobarese languages spoken on Chaura Island in the Nicobar Islands.

References

Languages of India

Nicobarese languages